Prees Higher Heath (commonly shortened to Higher Heath) is a large village located within the civil parish of Prees in north Shropshire, England.

Location
Prees Higher Heath is south of the town of Whitchurch, northeast of the small town of Wem and the village of Prees and west of Market Drayton. It is also north of the village of Prees Green and south of the villages of Tilstock and Prees Heath. The villages of Whixall and Edstaston are also west of the village.

Population
The population in 2001 was recorded at 1,151, increasing to 1,163  Census.

Transport

Roads
The A49 and A41 roads pass on either side of the village.

Railway
There are two railway stations within a close distance to the village, the first of which is the railway station of Prees and the second is railway station of Whitchurch.

Bus
The village is served by the 511 bus route, operated by Arriva Midlands North, which runs between Shrewsbury and Whitchurch via Wem. Some services terminate in Wem and do not continue to Whitchurch. There is a total of nine bus stops in the village.

See also
Listed buildings in Prees

References

External links

Villages in Shropshire